The Regional Council of Grand Est, formerly the regional council of Alsace-Champagne-Ardenne-Lorraine, is the deliberative assembly of the region of Grand Est. Jean Rottner of The Republicans (LR) is the current president of the regional council. He was elected on 20 October 2017, following the retirement of Philippe Richert on 30 September 2017.

History 
The regional council of Grand Est, previously Alsace-Champagne-Ardenne-Lorraine, was created by the act on the delimitation of regions, regional and departmental elections and amending the electoral calendar of 16 January 2015, which went into effect on 1 January 2016 and merged the regional councils of Alsace, Champagne-Ardenne, and Lorraine, consisting of 47, 49, and 73 regional councillors, respectively, into a single body with 169 regional councillors, following regional elections on 6 and 13 December 2015. The number of representatives elected for these three former regions was recalculated as a result of the reform, with Alsace electing 59 seats, Champagne-Ardenne electing 38 seats, and Lorraine electing 72 seats.

Seat 
The merger of the regions of Alsace, Champagne-Ardenne, and Lorraine necessitated the redistribution of administrative functions between the seats of the former regions. Philippe Richert, president of the newly unified region, proposed designating Strasbourg as the new capital and therefore seat of the regional council, with Strasbourg and Metz sharing the standing committee and plenary assembly. On 12 January 2016, Richert announced that Strasbourg would become the capital of the region and seat of the regional council, standing committee, and thematic committees, while the plenary assembly would convene in Metz. He also stated that there would be a "house of the regional council" in the three former regional capitals, located at 1 place Adrien Zeller in Lyon, 1 place Gabriel Hocquard in Metz, and 5 rue de Jéricho in Châlons-en-Champagne. The finance committee of the regional council was also relocated to Châlons-en-Champagne. These proposals were approved at a session of the plenary assembly on 29 April during which regional councillors also agreed to rename the region – then known as Alsace-Champagne-Ardenne-Lorraine – to Grand Est, following an online consultation in which 75% of participants voted in favor.

Election results

2015 regional election 
The current regional council was elected in regional elections on 6 and 13 December 2015, with the list of Philippe Richert consisting of The Republicans (LR), the Union of Democrats and Independents (UDI), and the Democratic Movement (MoDem) securing an absolute majority of 104 seats. After the first round, Jean-Pierre Masseret of the Socialist Party (PS) refused to withdraw his list before the second round, despite calls by the leadership of the party, as well as a number of members of Masseret's list, to vote for Richert's list in order to stop the National Front from winning the region. As a result, the PS renounced its support for Masseret and stated that he would "not have the Socialist label" in the second round.

Composition

Political groups 
The regional council currently consists of four political groups.

Executive

Presidents 

On 4 January 2016, Philippe Richert of The Republicans (LR) was elected president of the Alsace-Champagne-Ardenne-Lorraine region with 102 votes, against 46 votes for Florian Philippot of the National Front (FN), 20 blank votes, and 1 abstention, with the left not contesting the ballot.

On 30 September 2017, Philippe Richert of The Republicans (LR), announced his retirement from politics and resigned his post as president of the regional council. He was replaced in the interim by Jean-Luc Bohl of the Union of Democrats and Independents (UDI) until Jean Rottner was elected as his successor on 20 October. He received 96 votes, failing to secure the support of 8 members of his own group, against 35 votes for Virginie Joron of the FN and 1 vote for Christophe Choserot, a member of La République En Marche! elected under the banner of the Socialist Party (PS) sitting with the left in the regional council. A total of 37 blank and null ballots were cast. The Socialist group did not nominate a candidate and instead submitted blank votes, as did the group of The Patriots in the regional council due to a lack of "credible projects", implicitly rejecting the candidacy of Joron.

Vice presidents 
In addition to the president, the executive of the regional council also includes 15 vice presidents delegated to certain policy areas.

Committees 
The regional council includes 14 thematic committees which submit deliberations related to various policy areas.

References

External links 
Official website of the Grand Est region 

Politics of Grand Est
Grand_Est